The 1921–22 season was the 13th year of football played by Dundee Hibernian, and covers the period from 1 July 1921 to 30 June 1922.

Match results
Dundee Hibernian played a total of 39 matches during the 1921–22 season.

Legend

All results are written with Dundee Hibernian's score first.
Own goals in italics

Second Division

Scottish Cup

References

Dundee United F.C. seasons
Dundee Hibernian